The Central Union of Butchers and Kindred Trades of Germany was a trade union representing butchers and abattoir workers in Germany.

In 1898, Theodor Keslinke founded the Local Union of Butchers, in Berlin, with the aim of turning it into a national organisation.  In March 1900, it launched a national journal, Der Fleischer, and then on 1 June, it established the "Central Union of Meat Workers", a national union affiliated to the General Commission of German Trade Unions.  Membership grew steadily, from 2,000 in 1902, to 16,643 in 1927.

In 1913, the union held a conference which founded the International Federation of Meat Workers, and the union thereafter provided the federation's leadership.  In 1919, the union was a founding affiliate of the General German Trade Union Confederation.

On 24 September 1927, the union merged with the Central Union of Bakers and Confectioners, the Union of Brewery and Mill Workers, and the Union of Coopers, Cellar Managers, and Helpers in Germany, to form the Union of Food and Drink Workers.

Presidents
1900: Paul Hensel

References

Meat industry trade unions
Trade unions in Germany
Trade unions established in 1900
Trade unions disestablished in 1927